Oumarou Diaby (born 14 November 1987 in Nanterre) is a French footballer who has played midfield for Ligue 2 club US Creteil-Lusitanos and CFA 2 Group B club CMS Oissel among others.

Career
Born in Nanterre, Diaby began playing football with local amateur sides L'Entente SSG, Levallois SC and AS Poissy.

References

1987 births
Living people
French footballers
French sportspeople of Ivorian descent
People from Nanterre
Association football midfielders
Footballers from Hauts-de-Seine